Sailors, Beware! is a silent comedy short film starring Stan Laurel and Oliver Hardy prior to their official billing as the duo Laurel and Hardy. The team appeared in a total of 107 films between 1921 and 1951.

Plot
An honest cab driver (Laurel) picks up a woman (Anita Garvin) and her "baby", who is actually a midget in disguise. He does not realize his passengers are crooks. When they get out of the cab without paying and leave the meter running, Stan follows them aboard a ship, where he exposes the crooks.

Cast

References

External links 

1927 films
1927 comedy films
American black-and-white films
Laurel and Hardy (film series)
American silent short films
Films with screenplays by H. M. Walker
1927 short films
American comedy short films
Films directed by Fred Guiol
1920s American films
Silent American comedy films